Chondrostoma holmwoodii, sometimes known as the Izmir nase or Eastern Aegean nase, is a species of ray-finned fish in the family Cyprinidae. It is endemic to Western Turkey. The specific name holmwoodii honours Frederic Holmwood, collector of the holotype and British consul-general at what then was Smyrna (now İzmir).

Chondrostoma holmwoodii grows to  total length. It is a freshwater fish found in medium-sized streams to large rivers with rocky or gravel substrate and swift to moderately fast current. It is believed to be declining because of water pollution, water extraction, and dam construction. Also reduced rainfall associated with climate change is a threat.

References

Chondrostoma
Freshwater fish of Turkey
Endemic fauna of Turkey
Fish described in 1896
Taxa named by George Albert Boulenger
Taxonomy articles created by Polbot